Mary Joe Fernández and Pam Shriver were the defending champions, but Shriver did not compete this year.

Fernández teamed up with Robin White and successfully defended her title, by defeating Yayuk Basuki and Nana Miyagi 6–4, 6–4 in the final.

Seeds

Draw

Draw

References

External links
 Official results archive (ITF)
 Official results archive (WTA)

Nichirei International Championships
1992 WTA Tour